Nona was one of the Parcae, the three personifications of destiny in Roman mythology (the Moirai in Greek mythology and in Germanic mythology, the Norns), and the Roman goddess of pregnancy. The Roman equivalent of the Greek Clotho, she spun the thread of life from her distaff onto her spindle. Nona, whose name means "ninth", was called upon by pregnant women in their ninth month when the child was due to be born.

She, Decima and Morta together controlled the metaphorical thread of life.

Note

References 

 
 

Parcae
Childhood goddesses
Oracular goddesses
Roman goddesses
Time and fate goddesses
Textiles in folklore